"Lady of the Island" is a folk song written by Graham Nash in the late 1960s. The song appears on Crosby, Stills & Nash's critically acclaimed, self-titled debut album. The song is notable for taking its inspiration from fellow folk musician Joni Mitchell, with whom Nash was romantically involved at the time. It was also the only song from the debut album not performed during their Woodstock performance.

Nash wrote this song while he was a member of the Hollies, who rejected the song as being too personal. Along with the Hollies' rejection of Nash's song "Marrakesh Express," this caused Nash to leave the Hollies in 1968. (Source: "Dick Clark's 25 Years of Rock and Roll" (1981))

Personnel
David Crosby–harmony vocals
Graham Nash–lead vocals, acoustic guitar

References

Crosby, Stills, Nash & Young songs
1969 songs
Songs written by Graham Nash